Sidi Youssef Ben Ahmed is a commune in Sefrou Province, Fès-Meknès, Morocco. At the time of the 2004 census, the commune had a total population of 11,292 people living in 2,218 households.

References

Populated places in Sefrou Province
Rural communes of Fès-Meknès